, formerly , is a Japanese video game developer and record label for video game and anime music. It was formed on April 6, 2005 after Chiyomaru Shikura left Scitron to begin the company as its executive director, a position he still holds. The company is divided into two parts, 5pb. Games for the manufacturing of video games, and 5pb. Records for the record label. It was a wholly owned subsidiary of the TYO Group until Shikura purchased the remaining rights from the TYO Group on April 15, 2009. Shikura co-owns 5pb. with AGOne, an affiliate of Dwango Japan. Staff members include scenario writer Naotaka Hayashi, artist Yukihiro Matsuo, and producer Tatsuya Matsuhara.

In April 2011, a group of companies consisting of Arkray, Seed Project, Dwango Creative School, Animelo Summer Life, 5pb. Records, and 5pb. Games merged under the parent company Mages. Inc. led by executive director Chiyomaru Shikura. 

In July 2019, Mages was acquired by Shikura's concept studio Chiyomaru Studio, with the goal of being more flexible and fast in its decisions as a company independent from their parent company Dwango and from the Kadokawa group. With that said, while Mages would no longer be a part of Kadokawa Group following the management buyout, it still expected to maintain the same favorable relationship with the Group that it had so far. Along with this buyout, the company intended to strengthen its branding by consolidating the 5pb. brand into Mages.

In March 2020, Colopl acquired Mages from Chiyomaru Studio for ¥1.612 billion (approximately US$14.92 million).

In December 2022, it was reported that Mages would enter insolvency as a result of financial losses of ¥613,000 million (approximately US$4.6 million).

In January 2023, Chiyomaru Shikura announced via Twitter that he would resign as company Chairman and Executive Director, but stated that he would still be part of Mages as an Executive Producer.

Artists
Previously called 5pb. Records, since 2019 the brand does not exist anymore, with the Mages brand being the only one used for everything.

Video games
5pb. Games was a division of Mages, which dealt with video game development. The brand was originally named Five Games Kid, or 5gk. for short, but the name was changed in December 2007 to coincide with the name of 5pb.'s record label 5pb. Records. Some of 5pb. Games' developers arrived from KID, Tonkin House and Scitron, such as with Takeshi Abo in December 2006. Since 2019, the 5pb. Games brand is not used anymore, with the Mages brand being the only one used for everything.

Chiyomaru Studio

The company, which was originally named , was founded separately from Mages for the purpose of managing the copyrights to the media projects Shikura works on, including the Science Adventure franchise and the Occultic;Nine novel series, and for creating stories for use in various media. In July 2019, Chiyomaru Studio made a management buyout of Mages, acquiring all shares held by its former parent company Dwango; the following year, Chiyomaru Studio sold all Mages shares to Colopl.

While the concept work is done by Chiyomaru Studio, they work together with Mages to develop video games using the concepts, and with Kadokawa Corporation to print books and produce anime and manga. The studio includes staff members from Mages, who communicate through instant messaging; as of 2015, Shikura was the only on-site staff.

The first new intellectual property developed by Chiyomaru Studio, not based on Shikura's previous works, is the upcoming video game Anonymous;Code, which is developed together with Mages' video games division 5pb. Games, and is together with Occultic;Nine part of a media franchise referred to internally as Science Visual Novel. Chiyomaru Studio has also developed the Science Adventure game Robotics;Notes DaSH. Since 2017, the studio organizes live music events where they also release updates on their media projects, called "Chiyo-ST Live".

See also
Kaga Create, whose former subsidiary CyberFront was acquired by 5pb.
KID, whose assets 5pb acquired as part of CyberFront.

Notes

References

External links
 

 
Former Kadokawa Corporation subsidiaries
Anime companies
Video game companies established in 2005
Japanese companies established in 2005
Mass media in Tokyo
Video game companies of Japan
Video game publishers
Video game development companies
2019 mergers and acquisitions
2020 mergers and acquisitions